Blue Bayou are full-service New Orleans/Cajun-style restaurants renowned for their unusual ambiance. They are located at Disneyland in Anaheim, California, Disneyland Paris and Tokyo Disneyland, in Chiba, Japan.

Guests wishing to dine at the restaurant are advised to make reservations at least a day in advance. At Disneyland, it is advisable to reserve at least one week in advance for the 4–8 pm dinner period; reservations are accepted up to two months in advance.

The restaurant is built within the same show building that houses part of the Pirates of the Caribbean attraction, with parts of the ride even taking place beneath the restaurant. Although seated in a large, enclosed building, diners experience the illusion of being in an outdoor restaurant at nighttime. The effect is achieved through the use of a dark and distant ceiling, air conditioning, and carefully coordinated lighting. The theming is intensified by the sounds of crickets and frogs, the meandering glow of fireflies, and projection effects that imitate the night sky. The restaurant is also popular for offering a view of the beginning portion of Pirates of the Caribbean. Guests can see riders floating by in their boats, and the riders can see the restaurant's festive nighttime lighting as they pass by.

The Disneyland restaurant opened on March 18, 1967, to respond to persistent criticism of the park's lack of fine dining options. It was originally to feature live entertainment, but Disney historian Jim Korkis reported that after a dress rehearsal and trial dinner in 1966, Walt Disney declared "In this restaurant, the food is going to be the show, along with the atmosphere".

Blue Bayou was the first reservation-based eatery at Disneyland. A reservation could not be made by telephone. Guests had to physically go to the restaurant to sign up for an available time, often prompting a mad dash as soon as the gates opened.

Similar restaurants 
The Blue Lagoon restaurant at Disneyland Paris takes a similar approach to that of the Blue Bayous at the other Disney parks, but it is themed as a Caribbean beach rather than a Louisiana bayou.

Blue Bayou at Disney's Virtual Magic Kingdom 
Virtual Magic Kingdom featured a single room inspired by the Blue Bayou. The waiter was Gator Waiter. "Magic words" such as "mint julep" and "gumbo" allowed players to order food and drink.

References

External links 

 Official website

Walt Disney Parks and Resorts restaurants
Theme restaurants
New Orleans Square (Disneyland)
Restaurants in Orange County, California
Culture of Anaheim, California
Restaurants established in 1967
1967 establishments in California
Restaurants at Disneyland
Pirates of the Caribbean